Sollers Hope or Sollershope is a village and civil parish  south east of Hereford, in the county of Herefordshire, England. In 2001 the parish had a population of 68. The parish touches Brockhampton, How Caple, Much Marcle, Woolhope and Yatton. Sollers Hope shares a parish council with How Caple and Yatton called "How Caple Sollershope and Yatton Group Parish Council".

Landmarks 
There are 14 listed buildings in Sollers Hope. Sollers Hope has a church called St Michael.

History 
The name "Hope" means 'Valley', the Sollers part being because the de Solariis family held land in the 13th century. Soller's Hope was recorded in the Domesday Book as Hope.

References

External links 

 

Villages in Herefordshire
Civil parishes in Herefordshire